was an East German folk band from 1978 until 2001. It was founded in Cottbus as a sextet. For most of its lifespan, its core members were Matthias 'Kies' Kießling, Jörg 'Ko' Kokott and Scarlett Seeboldt. They reunited briefly in 2008 for a reunion tour. 

 is the German word for Juniper.

German folk music groups
1978 establishments in Germany
Stockfisch Records artists
East German musical groups